Disa is a minor Bongo–Bagirmi language of Chad.

References

Bongo–Bagirmi languages